Classic Hits/Pop (Local Version) (formerly known as Oldies Plus) was a 24-hour music format produced by Dial Global, formerly distributed by Waitt Radio Networks and then under the now-defunct Dial Global Local brand. Its playlist, like its sister network Classic Hits/Pop, targets listeners aged 25-54.

In June 2012, due to reorganizations at Dial Global, the Dial Global Local 24/7 formats were fully integrated into Dial Global's portfolio of formats, and "Dial Global Local" ceased to exist as a brand name. However, most of the former Dial Global Local formats are still offered to affiliate stations in the same manner in which they were previously offered. Oldies Plus is no longer offered under that name, but continues as a Local version of Dial Global's Classic Hits/Pop (formerly Kool Gold) format. By 2020, that station was discontinued.

Competitor networks 
Classic Hits and True Oldies Channel by Cumulus Media

Radio formats
Defunct_radio_networks_in_the_United_States
Defunct radio stations in the United States